The 1966 Pacific typhoon season was an active season, with many tropical cyclones having severe impacts in China, Japan, and the Philippines. Overall, there were 49 tropical depressions declared officially or unofficially, of which 30 officially became named storms; of those, 20 reached typhoon status, while 3 further became super typhoons by having winds of at least . Throughout the year, storms were responsible for at least 997 fatalities and $377.6 million in damage; however, a complete record of their effects is unavailable.

It is widely accepted that wind estimates in the Western North Pacific during the reconnaissance era prior to 1988 are subject to great error. In many cases, intensities were grossly overestimated due to a combination inadequate technology and a lesser understanding of the mechanics behind tropical cyclones as compared to the present day. Additionally, methodologies for obtaining wind estimates have changed over the decades and is not the same today as in 1966. A joint reanalysis of typhoons from 1966 to 1987 was conducted by the Cooperative Institute for Research in the Atmosphere at Colorado State University and the United States Naval Research Laboratory in 2006 to correct some of these errors. Many storms in 1966 received strength reductions as a result of this study; however, the results of the research have not been implemented into the official database. Notably the number of major typhoons, Category 3-equivalent or higher on the Saffir–Simpson hurricane wind scale, was reduced from eight to six, including the removal of a Category 5.

The western Pacific basin covers the Pacific Ocean, north of the equator and west of the International Date Line. Storms that form east of the date line and north of the equator are called hurricanes; see 1966 Pacific hurricane season. Tropical Storms formed in the entire west Pacific basin were assigned a name by the Joint Typhoon Warning Center (JTWC). The Japan Meteorological Agency (JMA) also monitored systems in the basin; however, it was not recognized as the Regional Specialized Meteorological Center until 1968. Tropical depressions that enter or form in the Philippine area of responsibility are assigned a name by the Philippine Atmospheric, Geophysical and Astronomical Services Administration (PAGASA), which can result in the same storm having two names; in these cases both storm names are given below, with the PAGASA name in parentheses.

Systems

Typhoon Hester (Atang)

Typhoon Irma (Klaring) 

115 mph Typhoon Irma hit the eastern Samar on May 15. It weakened over the island, but re-intensified rapidly to a 140 mph typhoon in the Sibuyan Sea before hitting Mindoro on the 17th. After weakening to a tropical storm, Irma turned northward to hit western Luzon as a 95 mph typhoon on the 19th. It accelerated to the northeast, and became extratropical on the 22nd. The extratropical remnant raced northeast before abruptly slowing on May 23 well to the east of Japan. During that time, it temporarily turned north while moving erratically. The system later acquired a general eastward track by May 26 and accelerated once more before dissipating near the International Date Line on May 29.

Severe damage took place across the Philippines, with Leyte suffering the brunt of Irma's impact. Twenty people died across the country. Preliminary reports indicated that Tacloban incurred $2.5 million in damage. A gasoline explosion near Manila that killed 12 people and injured 18 others was partially attributed to the typhoon. On May 17, the 740 ton vessel Pioneer Cebu sailed directly into the storm over the Visayan Sea off the coast of Malapascua Island after ignoring warnings to remain at port. Carrying 262 people, the ship struck a reef while battling rough seas in the typhoon. Passengers began abandoning the sinking vessel soon thereafter under the captain's orders while message about the ship's sinking was relayed by the radio operator. A large wave then struck the ship on its side, capsizing and submerging it entirely. Of the passengers and crew, 122 went down with the ship, including captain Floro Yap, while 140 managed to escape. Rescue operations lasted nearly two days, with many of the survivors being stranded in shark infested waters for upwards of 40 hours. Of the survivors, 130 were picked up by a rescue ship while 10 others were found on nearby islands. Only five bodies were recovered in the area while the rest were presumed to be lost with the ship in an area referred to as the "graveyard of ships." A trading vessel, the Banca Alex, also sank off the coast of Cebu with 80 people aboard; 60 were later rescued while 20 others were never found.

Typhoon Judy (Deling) 

Southern Taiwan bore the brunt of Judy's impact, with gusts in the region reaching . The high winds cut electricity throughout the port of Kaohsiung. A total of 18 people died while 14 were injured across the island. More than 1,000 homes sustained damage, of which 363 homes were destroyed. The banana crop suffered extensive damage in southern Taiwan, with two provinces reporting 70 percent lost. Total losses to the crop reached $25 million. Total damage amounted to NT$373.5 million. While over the South China Sea, a U.S. Navy aircraft with four crewmen crashed in the storm. A four-day search-and-rescue mission found no trace of the men.

Super Typhoon Kit (Emang) 

The incipient disturbance that became Super Typhoon Kit was first identified on June 20 near Chuuk State in the Federated States of Micronesia. The JMA designated that system as a tropical depression that day as the system moved steadily westward. The JTWC followed suit with this classification on June 22 following an investigation by reconnaissance. Early the next day, the depression acquired gale-force winds and was dubbed Tropical Storm Kit. Rapid intensification ensued late on June 24 into June 25; Kit's central pressure dropped 51 mbar (hPa) in 18 hours from 965 mbar (hPa) to 914 mbar (hPa). At 06:00 UTC on June 26, the JMA estimated Kit's pressure to have abruptly dropped to 880 mbar (hPa), which would rank it among the top ten most intense tropical cyclones on record. A later reconnaissance mission on June 26 reported a pressure of 912 mbar (hPa), the lowest observed in relation to the typhoon. Weakening ensued thereafter as the system accelerated to the north-northeast. The system subsequently weakened to a tropical storm and transitioned into an extratropical cyclone south of Hokkaido on June 29. The National Oceanic and Atmospheric Administration reported the remnants of Kit to have dissipated the following day near northeastern Hokkaido. However, the JMA states that the system turned eastward and accelerated over the north Pacific before losing its identity on July 3 near the International Date Line.

Although the center of Kit remained offshore, torrential rains and damaging winds wreaked havoc in eastern Japan. An estimated  of rain fell across the region, triggering deadly landslides and floods. More than 128,000 homes were affected by flooding, of which 433 collapsed. Large stretches of roadway crumbled or were blocked by landslides. Additionally, service along the  Tokyo–Osaka rail line was disrupted for 12 hours. "Hip-deep" waters also shut down Tokyo's subway system, stranding an estimated 2 million people. Throughout the country, 64 people died while a further 19 were listed missing. In the aftermath of the typhoon, 25 workers died from carbon monoxide poisoning from a portable generator while repairing a damaged irrigation tunnel near Utsunomiya.

Tropical Storm Lola (Gading) 

A tropical depression formed near the Eastern Visayas on July 8 and tracked west-northwest. After crossing Luzon on July 11, the system emerged over the South China Sea and began strengthening. Reaching tropical storm intensity on July 12, Lola tracked northwest toward Hong Kong. Lola subsequently made landfall near Hong Kong, where it killed one person, before rapidly dissipating over Guangzhou on July 14.

Severe Tropical Storm Mamie (Iliang)

Severe Tropical Storm Nina

Severe Tropical Storm Ora (Loleng)

Tropical Storm Phyllis 

Phyllis had minor effects during the Vietnam War, briefly limiting the number of bombing raids conducted by the United States due to squally weather.

Typhoon Rita 

Despite this observation, Rita is still considered a tropical storm with  winds at that time.

Typhoon Tess 

Typhoon Tess produced tremendous rainfall across Taiwan, with Alishan receiving  of rain, including  in just 18 hours. In contrast to the magnitude of the rain, damage was fairly limited and only one person was killed. Total losses reached NT$11.9 million with 19 homes destroyed and 9 others damaged. Rivers quickly over-topped their banks and flooded surrounding areas, causing widespread damage. Throughout the affected areas, 81 people died and another 117 were injured; 12 more were listed as missing. A total of 1,384 homes were destroyed and 8,351 sustained damage.

Severe Tropical Storm Susan (Oyang) 

According to the JTWC, Susan was absorbed by the nearby Typhoon Tess on August 16 while east of Taiwan. However, the JMA indicates that the system continued northward as a tropical depression and ultimately dissipated near Kyushu on August 18. As such, the operationally analyzed Tropical Depression Thirteen, which supposedly formed over the East China Sea on August 17, was actually a continuation of Susan.

Typhoon Viola 

Owing to the weakening before landfall, Viola caused only minor damage in Japan. Offshore, three vessels capsized amid rough seas.

Severe Tropical Storm Winnie

Severe Tropical Storm Betty

Super Typhoon Alice 

Super Typhoon Alice developed in the Western Pacific from a tropical wave on August 25. It moved to the north, looped to the west, and steadily strengthened to a peak of 150 mph. Alice continued to the west, hit eastern China on September 3, and dissipated the next day.

Across Okinawa, Alice killed one person and caused more than $10 million in damage. Winds estimated at  destroyed 150 homes and left 858 people homeless. North of Okinawa, 13 South Korean fishing boats sank amid rough seas; 12 people perished while 26 others were listed missing. Typhoon Alice produced a tremendous storm surge in Fujian Province, China, that caused widespread damage. Wind gusts up to  caused significant deforestation in the region as well, with 1.7 million trees falling. Casualty statistics are unknown though believed to be significant.

Super Typhoon Cora 

Typhoon Cora, which began its life on August 30, attained peak winds of 175 mph on September 5. It passed near Okinawa, causing major damage to the infrastructure on the island, but no loss of life. Cora continued to the northwest, hit northeastern China as a super typhoon on the 7th, and turned northeast to become extratropical near South Korea on the 9th.

Slowly moving by the southern Ryukyu Islands, Cora battered the region for more than 30 hours. This placed Cora as a greater than 1-in-100 year event in the region. Winds of least  battered Miyako-jima for 13 continuous hours. Of the 11,060 homes on Miyako-jima, 1,943 were destroyed and a further 3,249 severely damaged. The majority of these were wooden structures whose structures were compromised once their roof was torn off. Steel structures also sustained considerable damage while reinforced concrete buildings fared the best. The resulting effects rendered 6,000 residents homeless. The scale of damage varied across the island with Ueno-mura suffering the most extensive losses. Of the community's 821 homes, 90.1 percent was severely damaged or destroyed. A United States Air Force radar station was destroyed on the island. On nearby Ishigaki Island, where wind gusts reached , 71 homes were destroyed while a further 139 were severely damaged. Total losses from Cora in the region reached $30 million. Despite the severity of damage, no fatalities took place and only five injuries were reported.

Wind gusts up to  caused notable damage in Taiwan, with 17 homes destroyed and 42 more damaged. Three people were killed during Cora's passage while seventeen others sustained injury. Additionally, 5,000 persons were evacuated. Damage amounted to NT$4.2 million. Striking Fujian Province, China, on the heels of Typhoon Alice, Cora exacerbated damage in the region. Property damage was extreme with more than 21,000 homes destroyed and nearly 63,000 more damage. An estimated 265,000 people were severely affected by the storm. A total of 269 people perished during the storm while a further 2,918 were injured; 52 people were also listed missing.

Typhoon Doris

Typhoon Elsie (Pitang) 

Elsie's slow movement near Taiwan allowed to prolonged rainfall across the island. As a result, numerous counties saw record-breaking rains from the storm with six top-ten accumulations still holding through 2015. Yilan County saw the greatest totals from the storm with  falling; this is the greatest single-storm total in the county on record. Seven people were killed in Taiwan while thirty others sustained injury. A total of 120 homes collapsed while another 121 sustained damage. The banana crop experienced heavy losses, with damage reaching $500,000. Total losses amounted to NT$60.1 million.

Typhoon Flossie

Typhoon Grace

Severe Tropical Storm Helen (Ruping)

Typhoon June

Typhoon Ida 

On September 21, an area of disturbed weather was noted on TIROS imagery over the open Pacific well to the east of the Mariana Islands. Rapid intensification soon took place as the system accelerated to the northwest. By September 23, Ida attained typhoon intensity while recon reported the formation of a  elliptical eye. Turning northward, the system reached its peak intensity early on September 24 as a Category 3–equivalent typhoon with  winds. The typhoon subsequently made landfall near Omaezaki, Shizuoka around 15:00 UTC at this strength. A testament Ida's intensity, winds atop Mount Fuji gusted to  during the storm's passage. Once onshore, rapid structural degradation and overall weakening ensued. Transition into an extratropical cyclone took place shortly thereafter, with the system ultimately dissipating several hundred kilometers east of Japan on September 26.

Typhoon Kathy 

On October 6, a tropical depression was identified near Kwajalein Atoll in the Marshall Islands. Tracking generally north-northeast, little development occurred over the following several days. On October 9, the system was classified as Tropical Storm Kathy. Its motion subsequently stalled and the system executed a small clockwise loop over the following three days.

After maintaining its peak winds for 30 hours, Kathy began to degrade. A temporary turn to the east-northeast accompanied this weakening. Approaching 40°N, cold air began to entrain into the typhoon's circulation by October 19. Transition into an extratropical cyclone south of the Aleutian Islands on October 20 as the system turned eastward. Hurricane-force winds and  seas battered vessels in the region that day. Weakening to gale-force, the remnant cyclone later turned north on October 23 and headed toward western Canada. The system made landfall near Queen Charlotte Island (now known as Haida Gwaii), British Columbia, on October 24 and dissipated over land.

Typhoon Lorna (Titang)

Typhoon Marie

Severe Tropical Storm Nancy (Uding) 

On November 17, the JMA began monitoring a tropical depression near Yap. Traveling west-northwest, the system steadily organized and reached tropical storm strength on November 19. The intensifying storm moved over the Bicol Region of the Philippines that day before striking Calabarzon at its peak with winds of 110 km/h (70 km/h). Torrential rains across Luzon caused widespread damage; 32 fatalities and 14 million PHP (US$3.6 million) in losses resulted from Nancy. While passing north of Manila, the cyclone slowed and turned to the southwest before emerging over the South China Sea on November 21. One ship observed winds of  that day to the north of Nancy's center. Moving generally west, Nancy gradually decayed over the following five days, degrading to a tropical depression on November 25 and dissipating the following day well to the east of South Vietnam.

Tropical Storm Olga (Wening) 

A tropical depression was initially identified by the JMA well to the east of the Philippines on November 21. The following day, Olga brushed the northern tip of Luzon with peak winds of  before turning west and moving over the South China Sea. Subsequent interaction with a monsoon trough caused Olga to weaken and ultimately dissipate on November 25.

Typhoon Pamela (Aning) 

On December 24, a tropical depression developed to the east of Palau. Images from TIROS aided in locating the system on Christmas Day as it tracked west-northwest toward the Philippines. Pamela was responsible for heavy damage across the central Philippines with 30 people losing their lives, the majority of whom were fishermen. Initial assessments were difficult due to communication loss with the four hardest-hit provinces. Damage was estimated at 15 million PHP (US$6 million). Interaction with land imparted weakening on the system as it moved westward. Pamela made two additional landfalls at typhoon strength over Masbate and Mindoro before emerging over the South China Sea as a tropical storm. The cyclone weakened below gale-force early on December 31 and dissipated later that day to the west of South Vietnam.

Other systems 
In addition to the 30 named storms monitored by the JTWC throughout the year, 8 systems were warned upon that never reached gale-strength. Additionally, 11 other cyclones were warned upon by various agencies across East Asia, some of which were estimated to have reached tropical storm strength. Furthermore, disagreement on the intensity of these storms exists between the warnings centers. The table below lists the maximum intensity reported by any one agency for the sake of completeness. However, any tropical storms listed here are not considered official and thus are excluded from the season total.

Season effects 
This is a table of all of the storms that have formed in the 1966 Pacific typhoon season. It includes their names, duration, peak one-minute sustained winds, minimum barometric pressure, affected areas, damage, and death totals. Damage and deaths include totals while the storm was extratropical, a wave, or a low, and all of the damage figures are in 1966 USD. Names listed in parentheses were assigned by PAGASA.

|-
| Hester (Atang) ||  || bgcolor=#| || bgcolor=#| || bgcolor=#| || None ||  None ||  None ||
|-
| Irma (Klaring) ||  || bgcolor=#| || bgcolor=#| || bgcolor=#| || Philippines ||  ||  174 || 
|-
| Judy (Deling) ||  || bgcolor=#| || bgcolor=#| || bgcolor=#| || Taiwan ||  ||  22 || 
|-
| Kit (Emang) ||  || bgcolor=#| || bgcolor=#| || bgcolor=#| || Japan ||  N/A ||  89–108 ||
|-
| Lola (Gading) ||  || bgcolor=#| || bgcolor=#| || bgcolor=#| || Philippines, China, Hong Kong ||  N/A ||  1 ||
|-
| Mamie (Iliang) ||  || bgcolor=#| || bgcolor=#| || bgcolor=#| || China ||  N/A ||  N/A || 
|-
| Nina ||  || bgcolor=#| || bgcolor=#| || bgcolor=#| || None ||  None ||  None || 
|-
| Ora (Loleng) ||  || bgcolor=#| || bgcolor=#| || bgcolor=#| || China, Vietnam ||  N/A ||  N/A || 
|-
| Phyllis ||  || bgcolor=#| || bgcolor=#| || bgcolor=#| || Vietnam ||  N/A ||  N/A ||
|-
| Rita ||  || bgcolor=#| || bgcolor=#| || bgcolor=#| || None ||  None ||  None ||
|-
| Tess ||  || bgcolor=#| || bgcolor=#| || bgcolor=#| || Ryukyu Islands, Taiwan China ||  N/A ||  82–94 || 
|-
| Susan (Oyang) ||  || bgcolor=#| || bgcolor=#| || bgcolor=#| || None ||  None ||  None ||
|-
| Viola ||  || bgcolor=#| || bgcolor=#| || bgcolor=#| || Japan ||  N/A ||  N/A ||
|-
| Winnie ||  || bgcolor=#| || bgcolor=#| || bgcolor=#| || Japan, Korean Peninsula, China, Soviet Union ||  N/A ||  N/A ||
|-
| Betty ||  || bgcolor=#| || bgcolor=#| || bgcolor=#| || Japan, Korean Peninsula ||  N/A ||  N/A ||
|-
| Alice ||  || bgcolor=#| || bgcolor=#| || bgcolor=#| || Ryukyu Islands, China ||  ||  13–39 || 
|-
| Cora ||  || bgcolor=#| || bgcolor=#| || bgcolor=#| || Ryukyu Islands, Taiwan, China, Korean Peninsula ||  ||  272–324 ||
|-
| Nineteen ||  || bgcolor=#| || bgcolor=#| || bgcolor=#| || None ||  None ||  None ||
|-
| Twenty ||  || bgcolor=#| || bgcolor=#| || bgcolor=#| || None ||  None ||  None ||
|-
| Doris ||  || bgcolor=#| || bgcolor=#| || bgcolor=#| || Japan ||  N/A ||  N/A ||
|-
| Elsie (Pitang) ||  || bgcolor=#| || bgcolor=#| || bgcolor=#| || Taiwan, Ryukyu Islands ||  ||  7 || 
|-
| Flossie ||  || bgcolor=#| || bgcolor=#| || bgcolor=#| || None ||  None ||  None ||
|-
| Twenty-Two ||  || bgcolor=#| || bgcolor=#| || bgcolor=#| || None ||  None ||  None ||
|-
| Grace ||  || bgcolor=#| || bgcolor=#| || bgcolor=#| || None ||  None ||  None ||
|-
| Helen (Ruping) ||  || bgcolor=#| || bgcolor=#| || bgcolor=#| || Japan ||  N/A ||  N/A ||
|-
| June ||  || bgcolor=#| || bgcolor=#| || bgcolor=#| || None ||  None ||  None ||
|-
| Ida ||  || bgcolor=#| || bgcolor=#| || bgcolor=#| || Japan ||  ||  275–318 ||
|-
| Kathy ||  || bgcolor=#| || bgcolor=#| || bgcolor=#| || None ||  None ||  None ||
|-
| Thirty (Sening) ||  || bgcolor=#| || bgcolor=#| || bgcolor=#| || None ||  None ||  None ||
|-
| Thirty-One ||  || bgcolor=#| || bgcolor=#| || bgcolor=#| || None ||  None ||  None ||
|-
| Lorna (Titang) ||  || bgcolor=#| || bgcolor=#| || bgcolor=#| || Philippines ||  N/A ||  N/A ||
|-
| Thirty-Four ||  || bgcolor=#| || bgcolor=#| || bgcolor=#| || None ||  None ||  None ||
|-
| Marie ||  || bgcolor=#| || bgcolor=#| || bgcolor=#| || None ||  None ||  None ||
|-
| Thirty-Five ||  || bgcolor=#| || bgcolor=#| || bgcolor=#| || Vietnam ||  None ||  None ||
|-
| Nancy (Uding) ||  || bgcolor=#| || bgcolor=#| || bgcolor=#| || Philippines ||  ||  32 || 
|-
| Olga (Wening) ||  || bgcolor=#| || bgcolor=#| || bgcolor=#| || Philippines ||  N/A ||  N/A ||
|-
| Thirty-Eight (Yoling) ||  || bgcolor=#| || bgcolor=#| || bgcolor=#| || Philippines ||  None ||  None ||
|-
| Pamela (Aning) ||  || bgcolor=#| || bgcolor=#| || bgcolor=#| || Philippines ||  ||  30 || 
|-

See also 

 1966 Atlantic hurricane season
 1966 Pacific hurricane season
 Australian cyclone seasons: 1965–66, 1966–67
 South Pacific cyclone seasons: 1965–66, 1966–67
 South-West Indian Ocean cyclone seasons: 1965–66, 1966–67

Notes

References

External links 
 The Joint Typhoon Warning Center's Annual Tropical Cyclone Report for the 1966 season
  The Central Weather Bureau's report on the 1966 season